Wílliam Luis Ramallo Fernández (born 4 July 1963) is a retired football striker who was nicknamed El Pescador del Área, or El Fantasma.

He is currently the assistant coach for the Bolivia national football team.

Club career
Ramallo was born in Cochabamba.  He played for Oriente Petrolero at the time of his international appearances.

International career
He was capped 36 times and scored 11 international goals for Bolivia between 1989 and 1997. He played all three matches at the 1994 FIFA World Cup and he was also the starting forward in every group game. He represented his country in 15 FIFA World Cup qualification matches.

Personal life
Ramallo has a footballer son, Rodrigo, who also played for the national team.

International goals

References

External links

playerhistory 

1963 births
Living people
Sportspeople from Cochabamba
Association football forwards
Bolivian footballers
Bolivia international footballers
1993 Copa América players
1994 FIFA World Cup players
Club Bolívar players
C.D. Jorge Wilstermann players
Club Destroyers players
Oriente Petrolero players
Bolivian football managers
Nacional Potosí managers
Club San José managers